Albert Courquin (30 March 1875 – 24 March 1953) was a French sport shooter who competed at the 1908 Summer Olympics and 1924 Summer Olympics.

In the 1908 Olympics he won a bronze medal in the team free rifle event and was fourth in the team military rifle event. Sixteen years later he won a silver medal in the team free rifle event and was sixth in the individual 600 m free rifle event.

References

External links
Albert Courquin's profile at databaseOlympics

1875 births
1953 deaths
French male sport shooters
Olympic shooters of France
Shooters at the 1908 Summer Olympics
Shooters at the 1924 Summer Olympics
Olympic silver medalists for France
Olympic bronze medalists for France
Olympic medalists in shooting
Medalists at the 1908 Summer Olympics
Medalists at the 1924 Summer Olympics
20th-century French people